Narayanganj Club Limited is  social club in Bangladesh. It was originally established as the European Club in Narayanganj during the period of British rule in India in 1893.

History 

Narayanganj Club Limited was established in 1883 as the European Club in Narayanganj. Initially membership of the club was restricted to individuals from Great Britain and Ireland, and Indians were not allowed to become members; the club was expanded in 1905. During the Second World War the club allowed some Australians and Americans to become members. In 1947 following the partition of India membership of the club was opened to Indians. Narayanganj club was described as livelier than Dacca Club by S. N. Maitra in his autobiographical book A Collector's Piece. He described Scots, engaged in the jute trade, celebrating St. Andrews day with dancing and Scotch Whisky.

The Second annual meeting of the Jute Association was held in Narayanganj Club on 8 December 1951 under President of the Association, M. M. Ispahani.

In 1967, the first Bengali president M. A. Sattar was elected. 

In 1973, Mizanur Rahman Chowdhury, Minister of Information, spoke at the two day conference of Bangladesh Journalists Association where he assured them that the Freedom of the Press will be respected in the newly independent Bangladesh.

In December 2007, Kashem Jamal, who was the vice-President of Bangladesh Knitwear Manufacturers and Exporters Association, was elected President of Narayanganj Club.

In 2010, the National Women's Chess Championship was held at Narayanganj Club.

Membership stood at 250 in 1992 and had increased to 1400 in 2014. On 19 July 2016, during the Attacks by Islamic extremists in Bangladesh from 2015-2016, Narayanganj Club received a letter from the Islamic State affiliate in Bangladesh that threatened to kill 20 members of the club. In 2018 an audit by SH Khan & Co found financial irregularities in the club finances.

In 2018, Narayanganj Club became the runners up of the Snooker Team Championship held at Dhaka Club.

See also
Dhaka Club

References

Clubs and societies in Bangladesh
1893 establishments in India
Organisations based in Narayanganj